Kampong Svay may refer to several places or districts in Cambodia:

 Kampong Svay District in Kampong Thom Province
Kampong Svay, Banteay Meanchey